Coumba Gawlo Seck is a Senegalese singer-songwriter and composer who was born in February 1972 in Tivaouane. She is the second best selling Senegalese singer in Senegal after Youssou N'Dour. Her greatest success was a version of "Pata Pata", a platinum single which was number one for two weeks in Belgium and sold 50,000 copies one day in France in 1998.

References
[ Coumba Gawlo] at Allmusic

20th-century Senegalese women singers
People from Dakar
Living people
1972 births
21st-century Senegalese women singers